Jana Budíková (born 12 June 1946) is a Czech painter and printmaker.

Budíková graduated from the Theatre Faculty of the Academy of Performing Arts in Prague, where she studied from 1965 until 1971. She has been a member of the groups Umělecká beseda and Hollar during her career. She is a relative of the composer Otakar Jeremiáš. She has exhibited her work extensively throughout the Czech Republic.

A silkscreen by Budíková, Dedìkace/Dedication of 1995, is owned by the National Gallery of Art.

References

1946 births
Living people
Czech women painters
Czech printmakers
Women printmakers
Academy of Performing Arts in Prague alumni
20th-century Czech painters
20th-century Czech printmakers
20th-century Czech women artists
21st-century Czech painters
21st-century printmakers
21st-century Czech women artists